Archaeological Museum Banbhore or Banbhore Museum is an archaeological museum located in Banbhore, Sindh, Pakistan. The museum was established by the Department of Archaeology and Museums, Government of Pakistan, on 21 August 1960. The museum was inaugurated on 14 May 1967. In May 2010, management of the site of Banbhore, along with the museum, was transferred to the Culture Department of the Government of Sindh.

History
The site of Banbhore hides large numbers of remains of a settlement.

Banbhore is an ancient archaeological site and the city is more than 2100 years old. It was the capital of chief Bamboo Raja around the 10th century and was named after him. In most historical books, Banbhore is named and recognized as Debal, which is accepted by some historians, scholars, and archaeologists. This city is also a known landmark of Islam because Islam entered into the subcontinent from the city of Banbhore. Preliminary excavation was started by Majumdar in 1928 and in 1951 by Alcock.

See also
List of museums in Pakistan

References

External links
 

1960 establishments in Pakistan
Art museums and galleries in Pakistan
History museums in Pakistan
Museums established in 1960
Museums in Sindh
Tourist attractions in Sindh
Thatta District